The Serie A Player of the Month is an association football award that recognises the best player each month in Serie A, the top tier of the Italian football league system. The winner is chosen by an online public vote, in which voters choose from five nominees. The nominees are chosen through analysis by data tracking software, which consider statistical data, positional data and the contribution to the technical and physical efficiency of the team. The award is known as EA Sports Player of the Month for sponsorship reasons. 

The first award was assigned to Fiorentina player Frank Ribéry for his performances in September 2019. Seven players – Hakan Çalhanoğlu, Alejandro Gómez, Khvicha Kvaratskhelia, Ruslan Malinovskyi, Sergej Milinković-Savić, Victor Osimhen and Cristiano Ronaldo – have won the most awards, with two each. No player has won the award in two consecutive months, but Kvaratskhelia is the only player to win the award multiple times in the same season. Napoli players have one the award a record seven times, and they alongside Atalanta are the only clubs to have players win the award in two consecutive months. Çalhanoğlu is the only player to win the award while playing for two teams: Inter Milan and AC Milan.

Napoli's Kalidou Koulibaly and Kim Min-jae are the only defenders to win the award, which has been given to 10 midfielders and 19 forwards. It has also been given to foreign players 28 times; the most represented country is Argentina (four titles), followed by Portugal and Serbia (three each). The most recent winner is Napoli's Khvicha Kvaratskhelia, who won it for his performances in February 2023.

Key 
 Position key: GK – Goalkeeper; DF – Defender; MF – Midfielder; FW – Forward.

List of winners

Multiple winners

Awards won by club

Awards won by nationality

References 

Serie A trophies and awards
Serie A players
Association football player non-biographical articles